Abba is an unincorporated community in Irwin County, in the U.S. state of Georgia.

History
A post office called Abba was established in 1884, and remained in operation until 1954. Besides the post office, Abba contained a railway depot.

References

Unincorporated communities in Irwin County, Georgia
Unincorporated communities in Georgia (U.S. state)